The Civil List Act 1760 (1 Geo. 3 c. 1) was an Act of the Parliament of Great Britain passed upon the accession of George III.

The Act transferred almost all civil list revenues (mainly customs and excise) to Parliament. In the last year of George II's reign these had been worth £876,988. In return, the new king received a fixed, annual civil list of £800,000. Under George II the economy had grown and consequently the revenues increased. The fixed amount George III received was therefore a reduction in the Civil List.

If the previous arrangement had been retained, George III's civil list in 1777 would have been more than £1,000,000 and would have amounted to £1,812,308 in 1798. The £800,000 stipulated in the Act was soon found to be inadequate and a civil list crisis was only averted in the early 1760s because George II had built up savings worth £172,000 that George III was able to draw on. By the end of the decade the civil list arrears amounted to more than half a million pounds and the king had to apply to Parliament to pay it off.

Notes

Bibliography
 

Great Britain Acts of Parliament 1760